Michael Todd Ballard (born 1973) is an American Christian musician, worship leader, and guitarist, who primarily plays a contemporary Christian style of worship music. His first studio album, Anthems, was released in 2013.

Early life
Michael Todd Ballard was born in 1973, the son of a preacher, who grew up in Henderson, Kentucky, where he was a 1991 graduate of Henderson County High School.

Music career
His music recording career began in 2013, with the studio album, Anthems, that was released independently, on February 5, 2013.

Personal life
Ballard resides in Lexington, Kentucky, with his wife, Cindy, and their two children, where he is the worship pastor at NorthEast Christian Church. He was previously the worship leader at Red Rocks Church in Colorado, for ten years.

Discography
Albums
 Anthems (February 9, 2013)

References

External links
 Official website
 Twitter account

1973 births
Living people
American performers of Christian music
Singers from Colorado
Songwriters from Kentucky
Songwriters from Colorado
People from Henderson, Kentucky
Singers from Kentucky
21st-century American singers